Svetlana Pachshenko (born 26 July 2000) is a Kazakhstani professional racing cyclist, who most recently rode for UCI Women's Continental Team .

Major results
2017
 3rd Time trial, National Junior Road Championships
2018
 1st Youth Olympic Games, Road Race
National Junior Road Championships
1st  Time trial
3rd Road Race
2019
National Road Championships
1st  Road Race
4th Time trial

References

External links

2000 births
Living people
Kazakhstani female cyclists
Place of birth missing (living people)
Cyclists at the 2018 Summer Youth Olympics
Islamic Solidarity Games medalists in cycling
Islamic Solidarity Games competitors for Kazakhstan
21st-century Kazakhstani women